Qaber Shamiyah, also known as Dizen, is a village near Tell Tamer in western al-Hasakah Governorate, northeastern Syria. Administratively it belongs to the Nahiya Tell Tamer.

The village is inhabited by Assyrians belonging to the Assyrian Church of the East, and Arabs. At the 2004 census, it had a population of 734. When the Islamic State group took over, the Mar Chamoun church was burned. By the end of 2021, there were only three Assyrian Christians remaining in the village.

See also

Assyrians in Syria
List of Assyrian settlements
Al-Hasakah offensive (February–March 2015)

References

Assyrian communities in Syria